Josef Hassmann (21 May 1910 – 1 September 1969) was an Austrian football forward who played for Austria in the 1934 FIFA World Cup. He also played for FC Admira Wacker Mödling, FC Vienne, Team Wiener Linien, and SK Rapid Wien.

References

1910 births
1969 deaths
Austrian footballers
Austria international footballers
Association football forwards
FC Admira Wacker Mödling players
SK Rapid Wien players
1934 FIFA World Cup players